Andreas Bergwall (born 10 June 1974) is a Swedish bandy player who currently plays in Västerås SK as a goalkeeper.  Bergwall is the younger brother of Marcus Bergwall. Bergwall has played many games for Sweden's national team and has played in several Bandy World Championship tournaments and is regarded as one of, if not the best goalkeeper in the world.

Bergwall has made 174 appearances for Sweden.

Honours

Country 

 Sweden
 Bandy World Championship: 1997, 2003, 2005, 2009, 2010, 2012, 2017

Notes

References

External links
 
 

1974 births
Living people
Swedish bandy players
IFK Kungälv players
Västerås SK Bandy players
Vetlanda BK players
Hammarby IF Bandy players
Dynamo Kazan players
Tillberga IK Bandy players
Expatriate bandy players in Russia
Sweden international bandy players
Bandy World Championship-winning players